Organized in 1870, the Atlanta and Richmond Air–Line Railway combined the Georgia Air Line Railroad and the Air Line Railroad in South Carolina under president Algernon S. Buford. The line was complete by 1873 but went broke the next year when it was re-organized into the Atlanta and Charlotte Air Line Railway.

It later became part of the Southern Railway.

References 

 

Defunct Georgia (U.S. state) railroads
Railway lines in Atlanta
Predecessors of the Southern Railway (U.S.)
Railway companies established in 1870
Railway companies disestablished in 1876
Defunct South Carolina railroads
Defunct North Carolina railroads
American companies disestablished in 1876
American companies established in 1870